Zoltán Verrasztó (born 15 March 1956 in Budapest) is a former backstroke and medley swimmer from Hungary.

He won two medals at the 1980 Summer Olympics in Moscow, Soviet Union. Verrasztó claimed silver in the men's 200 m backstroke, and bronze in the men's 400 m individual medley. Apart from that he twice became world champion in the 200 m backstroke during the 1970s.

His children, Evelyn Verrasztó and Dávid Verrasztó are also Olympic swimmers. He coached them to become European championship gold medalists.

External links
 
 

1956 births
Living people
Hungarian male swimmers
Male backstroke swimmers
Male medley swimmers
Swimmers at the 1972 Summer Olympics
Swimmers at the 1976 Summer Olympics
Swimmers at the 1980 Summer Olympics
Olympic swimmers of Hungary
Olympic silver medalists for Hungary
Olympic bronze medalists for Hungary
Swimmers from Budapest
World record setters in swimming
Olympic bronze medalists in swimming
World Aquatics Championships medalists in swimming
European Aquatics Championships medalists in swimming
European champions for Hungary
Medalists at the 1980 Summer Olympics
Olympic silver medalists in swimming
Universiade medalists in swimming
Universiade gold medalists for Hungary
Universiade silver medalists for Hungary
Universiade bronze medalists for Hungary
Medalists at the 1977 Summer Universiade
20th-century Hungarian people
21st-century Hungarian people